This is a list of 19th-century British children's literature titles, arranged by year of publication.

See also
 Books in the United Kingdom

British children's literature
 Titles
19th century-related lists
Child